The 2008 Taiwan Series was played by the Uni-President 7-Eleven Lions, team that placed first in the all-season standing, and the Brother Elephants, wild card winner who advanced to Taiwan Series by defeating La New Bears in the Playoff Series. The Lions defeated the Elephants four games to three and won the title and went on to represent Taiwan in the 2008 Asia Series.

Participants
Uni-President 7-Eleven Lions - First seed; winner of the first half-season.
La New Bears - Second seed; winner of the second half-season.
Brother Elephants - Third seed; wild card winner by virtue of placing third in all-season standing after the Lions and the Bears.

Rules
All regular season rules apply with the following exceptions:
 Each team is allowed to register 28 players on its active roster.
 No tied games.
 Two outfield umpires are added to the games.

Summaries

Game 1
October 25, 2008 at Tainan Municipal Baseball Stadium, Tainan City

Game 2
October 26, 2008 at Chengcing Lake Baseball Field, Niaosong, Kaohsiung County

Game 3
October 28, 2008 at Taichung Intercontinental Baseball Stadium, Taichung City

Game 4
October 29, 2008 at Xinzhuang Baseball Stadium, Taipei County

Game 5
October 30, 2008 at Xinzhuang Baseball Stadium, Taipei County

Game 6
November 1, 2008 at Tainan Municipal Baseball Stadium, Tainan City

Game 7
November 2, 2008 at Tainan Municipal Baseball Stadium, Tainan City

Taiwan Series
Chinese Professional Baseball League Playoffs, 2008